Battling Butler is a 1926 American comedy silent film directed by and starring Buster Keaton. It is based on the 1923 musical Battling Buttler. The film entered the public domain in 2022.

Plot

Alfred Butler is a scion of a wealthy family, but an embarrassment to his father as Alfred is a slight, gentle young man, accustomed to ease and luxury. His father suggests a hunting and fishing trip to toughen him up. Alfred goes on the trip, accompanied by his chauffeur and his personal valet. During the excursion, he falls in love at first sight with a low-class mountain girl who lives with her family in a shack. In order to impress her working-class family, the valet tells them that Alfred is the well-known professional championship fighter who happens to have the same name and fights under the professional sobriquet "Battling Butler". From there, the masquerade must be maintained, in public and in private. When he returns, Alfred is greeted by a cheering crowd of boxing enthusiasts who think that he is the fighter.

Alfred expects that he will have to actually fight one of the Battling Butler's opponents and trains as best he can. On the day of the fight, he reluctantly dons his boxing trunks and gloves, expecting to be badly beaten. To his great relief, the real Battling Butler shows up, fights, and wins.

However, the Battler resents having been impersonated by a feeble milquetoast like Alfred. In the locker room, he starts punching Alfred in the head and body. This continues until Alfred sees that the door of the locker room is open and his beloved is watching. Inspired, he begins fighting back, his confidence and fury increasing with each blow he lands. To everyone's surprise, the beating turns into a real contest, and culminates in a knockout victory for Alfred, who, in a frenzy of unaccustomed blood-lust, continues savaging the unconscious Battler until the Battler's trainer and manager rush in and restrain him. Shocked by his own prowess, he confesses his deception to his beloved. She forgives him, and they celebrate with an evening on the town, Alfred still dressed in his boxing trunks and athletic shoes, but also wearing a top hat and carrying a classy walking stick.

Origins
Like Keaton's earlier Seven Chances, the film is an adaption of a stage work. The musical was called Battling Buttler, by Walter L. Rosemont and Ballard MacDonald, and starred Charlie Ruggles on Broadway. It ran from October 8, 1923, to July 5, 1924. The New York Times  noted the difference in the spelling of the name of the central character between the stage and film versions.

Cast

 Buster Keaton as Alfred Butler
 Sally O'Neil as the mountain girl
 Walter James as her father
 Budd Fine as her brother
 Francis McDonald as Alfred "Battling" Butler
 Mary O'Brien as his wife
 Tom Wilson as his trainer
 Eddie Borden as his manager
 Snitz Edwards as Alfred's valet

References

External links

 
 
 
 
 Battling Butler at the International Buster Keaton Society

1926 films
American silent feature films
American black-and-white films
American boxing films
Films directed by Buster Keaton
Metro-Goldwyn-Mayer films
Silent American comedy films
Films produced by Joseph M. Schenck
1926 comedy films
1920s American films
Articles containing video clips